Neocompsa cylindricollis is a species of beetle in the family Cerambycidae. It was described by Johan Christian Fabricius in 1798.

References

Neocompsa
Beetles described in 1798